Herne may refer to:

Places

Australia
 Herne Hill, Victoria
 Herne Hill, Western Australia, a suburb of Perth
 Riverwood, New South Wales, formerly known as Herne Bay

England
 Herne, Kent, near the town of Herne Bay
 Herne Bay, seaside town located in southeastern Kent
 Herne Common, Kent
 Herne Hill in London

Elsewhere
 Herne, Belgium
 Herne, North Rhine-Westphalia, Germany
 Herne Bay, New Zealand, a suburb of Auckland

Other uses
 Herne (surname)
 Herne the Hunter, an English mythological figure said to haunt Windsor Forest

See also
Ahearn
Aherne
Hearn (disambiguation)
Herne Bay (disambiguation)
Hernes